Interstate 985 (I-985) is a  auxiliary Interstate Highway in Northeast Georgia. It links the Atlanta metropolitan area to the city of Gainesville via Suwanee. I-985 is also known as the Sidney Lanier Parkway, after the musician and poet, and is also designated as unsigned State Route 419 (SR 419). The roadway was designated as I-985 in 1985. I-985 and SR 365 are concurrent for I-985's entire length, but only the I-985 signs are displayed. I-985 is also concurrent with US Route 23 (US 23) from exit 4 northward. I-985 is the highest-numbered spur route of a north–south Interstate and is second only to I-990, which serves the Buffalo–Niagara Falls metropolitan area.

Route description

Gwinnett County
In Gwinnett County, I-985 begins concurrent with SR 365 at an interchange with I-85 on the southeastern edge of Suwanee. The two highways head northeast to Buford, at an interchange with US 23/SR 20 (Buford Drive). Here, US 23 joins the concurrency of I-985/SR 365.

Hall County

The three routes head northeast into Hall County until they meet SR 347. In Flowery Branch, they meet Spout Springs Road at the Rankin Smith Interchange, named after the respective businessperson. Then, at exit 14 by Martin Road (HF Reed Industry). Then, they enter Oakwood and meet SR 53 (Mundy Mill Road), which does not have any return access from southbound I-985/US 23/SR 365. Just after, they enter Gainesville, where they intersect SR 13 (Atlanta Highway). Its interchange has access to both SR 13 and SR 53. Farther into Gainesville is SR 53 Connector (SR 53 Conn)/SR 60 (Candler Road/Queen City Parkway). In the main part of the city, US 129/US 129 Business (US 129 Bus)/SR 11 (Athens Highway) meet the concurrency. US 129/SR 11 head south toward Jefferson, while US 129 joins the concurrency through the rest of the city. Meanwhile, US 129 Bus/SR 11 head north into the heart of Gainesville. Nearly  later US 129 departs to the north with SR 369 on Jesse Jewell Parkway. About  later, I-985 ends, while US 23/SR 365 continue north. Then, US 23 enters North Carolina

National Highway System
All of I-985 is included as part of the National Highway System, a system of roadways important to the nation's economy, defense, and mobility.

History

1920s

The roadway that would eventually become I-985 was built at least as early as 1919 as SR 13 from Buford to just northeast of Gainesville, along the same alignment as it runs today. A reconfiguration of the SR 13 and SR 15 intersection in the Baldwin–Cornelia area caused the two routes to run concurrently between the two cities. By the end of 1926, a small section in Gainesville was paved. By 1929, US 23 was designated along the section from Buford to Gainesville.

1930s–1940s
By 1932, US 23 was designated along the route all the way to Cornelia. In addition, the entire route, from Buford to the South Carolina state line, was paved. The next month, US 23, and possibly SR 13 was extended south from Buford. In 1935, after a long series of improvement projects, the section just south of Buford was paved. Between 1946 and 1948, US 123 entered the state, being routed on a concurrency with SR 13 between Toccoa and the state line. Prior to April 1949, US 123's concurrency with SR 13 was extended to Cornelia. During this time, US 441 was extended along SR 15, thus beginning a concurrency with SR 13.

1950s–1970s
Between 1955 and 1957, a freeway (presumably I-85) was under construction from northeast Atlanta northeast to Suwannee, paralleling US 23/SR 13. Between 1957 and 1960, I-85 was completed as far north as what is now known as SR 317, which is located just southwest of what is now the southern terminus of I-985/SR 365, and, by 1966, it was completed northeast of Atlanta within the state. In 1966, SR 365 was being projected as a freeway from its current southern terminus northeast and curving around the southeastern side of Gainesville. In 1969, the whole freeway section, with the exception of the southernmost portion from I-85 to US 23/SR 20, was completed. Also, the entire completed section was designated as SR 365. The next year, the southernmost segment was completed. By 1979, the SR 365 freeway was listed as "under construction" from the northern terminus of the freeway northeast to US 23/US 441/SR 15 near Cornelia.

1980s–1990s
Between 1980 and 1982, SR 365 was extended along the "under construction" section, but it was not a freeway. Also, US 23/SR 13 from Gainesville to Cornelia were moved onto this new highway. By 1986, the entire freeway segment was designated as I-985.

Exit list

See also

References

External links

 Georgia State Route 419 / Interstate 985 on State-Ends.com

85-9
85-9
9
Transportation in Gwinnett County, Georgia
Transportation in Hall County, Georgia